KTMQ (103.3 FM) is an active rock radio station that serves the Temecula Valley and Inland Empire areas.  The station is owned by iHeartMedia, Inc.

Station origin
KTMQ launched in 2000 to simulcast the signal of KGB, and was called KGBB at launch.  The KGB signal is very weak in southern Riverside County, from where many San Diego-area workers now commute daily.  In 2005, the signal broke off to become a local station.

On February 14, 2011, Mötley Crüe's Nikki Sixx joined the KTMQ line up.

Programming
Program director and Wedding DJ Michael Dellinger a/k/a Mikie started as the mid-day host from 10 a.m. to 3 p.m. Dellinger programed the changed format from classic rock to the new active rock alternative. Mikie continued to host his ALL REQUEST LUNCHBOX during the morning/mid days until 11/2012. He took over as morning show host as of November 2012. (Prior KTMQ aired the Dave, Shelly, and Chainsaw morning show, which originated from 101.5 KGB in San Diego until its cancellation in January 2010.) November 2019 as iHeart chose to used the KIOZ morning team to take over the mornings to replace Mikie with the goal of increased morning drive time revenues. Temecula is an unrated market in the outer Inland Empire. Any theory on an increase of ratings would be false. By December 2019 Mikie was cut from his shift at KIOZ Rock 1053 due to "budget cuts." The San Diego morning show merger moved Mikie Dellinger to the afternoon drive 3pm-7pm.

November 2020 Mikie Dellinger was laid off and forced go full time with his successful wedding and event DJ services for the local budget minded clientele. Www.Dellinger.Rocks is where we found his business page.  We do not know if this change had to do with the 2020 COVID situation, or it was another down sizing plan. It's likely based on iHeart Riverside only able to contain one semi-live station in their cluster. There are no live DJs in this cluster for iHeart as much of radio has gone all pre recorded and "canned" voices from out of state. This is a repetitive move for this cluster, where management increases station revenues but trying to sell out of market personalities with zero local persona. It has been 2 years since the departure with Dellinger, and iHeart Riverside has completely wiped away Q103.3 to zero ratings. The Temecula market has zero ratings and limited listenership.

External links
Official Website

Active rock radio stations in the United States
TMQ
Radio stations established in 2000
Temecula, California
2000 establishments in California
IHeartMedia radio stations